Baturu (Manchu:  baturu) was an official title of the Qing dynasty, awarded to commanders and soldiers who fought bravely on the battlefield. In Manchu, baturu means "warrior" or "brave." It is originally from the Mongolian word baγatur, which has the same meaning.

At the beginning of the Qing dynasty, only Manchu and Mongol soldiers were permitted to receive the title. In the Jiaqing period, over 100 years after the dynasty was founded, the emperor started awarding the title to Han Chinese soldiers as well. Beginning in the Xianfeng period, civilians and foreigners were permitted to receive the title as well.

Recipients
Bao Chao
Cheng Xueqi
William Mesny
Oboi
Song Qing
Frederick Townsend Ward
Xiang Rong
Zeng Guofan
Zhang Guoliang

References

Military history of the Qing dynasty
Military awards and decorations of China
Titles